Gotter is a surname. Notable people with the surname include:

Friedrich Wilhelm Gotter (1746–1797), German poet and dramatist
Pauline Gotter (1786–1854), wife of Friedrich Wilhelm Gotter

See also
Gotter Hotel, historic building in Enterprise, Oregon, United States